The Curse of Willow Song is a Canadian horror thriller film, directed by Karen Lam and released in 2020. The film stars Valerie Tian as Willow Song, a young woman in Vancouver who has recently been released from prison, blending both social realism and supernatural horror as Willow grapples with choices about her life.

Its cast also includes Simon Chin, Elfina Luk and Ingrid Nilson.

Lam has described the film as inspired by Japanese horror films, in particular the early experimental film Pages of Madness.

The film premiered at the 2020 Vancouver International Film Festival, where it won the award for Best British Columbia Film.

References

External links

2020 films
2020 horror thriller films
Canadian horror thriller films
English-language Canadian films
Films shot in Vancouver
Films set in Vancouver
Films about Asian Canadians
2020s English-language films
2020s Canadian films